The 1994–95 Romanian Hockey League season was the 65th season of the Romanian Hockey League. Five teams participated in the league, and Steaua Bucuresti won the championship.

Regular season

External links 
 Season on hockeyarchives.info

Rom
Rom
Romanian Hockey League seasons